The Savanna–Sabula Bridge was a truss bridge and causeway crossing the Mississippi River that connected the city of Savanna, Illinois, with the island city of Sabula, Iowa. The bridge was put out of service on November 17, 2017, when its replacement, which lies a few dozen feet downstream, opened as the Dale Gardner Veterans Memorial Bridge. The bridge carried U.S. Route 52 over the river. It was also the terminus of both Iowa Highway 64 and Illinois Route 64. The bridge carried an average of 2,170 vehicles daily as of 2015, with 6% of that being truck traffic.

The bridge was demolished on March 9, 2018

It was added to the National Register of Historic Places in 1999.

Replacement bridge 
Construction of an $80.6 million replacement for the 1932 Savanna–Sabula Bridge was finished and opened to traffic on November 17, 2017, while the old bridge was subsequently demolished. The Illinois House of Representatives unanimously named this new structure the Dale Gardner Veterans Memorial Bridge in honor of Dale Gardner, a Savanna born NASA astronaut.

See also 
List of crossings of the Upper Mississippi River

References

External links

Bridges over the Mississippi River
Bridges of the United States Numbered Highway System
U.S. Route 52
Truss bridges in the United States
Bridges completed in 1932
Road bridges on the National Register of Historic Places in Illinois
Road bridges on the National Register of Historic Places in Iowa
National Register of Historic Places in Jackson County, Iowa
Transportation buildings and structures in Carroll County, Illinois
Transportation buildings and structures in Jackson County, Iowa
Former toll bridges in Iowa
Former toll bridges in Illinois
Steel bridges in the United States
Interstate vehicle bridges in the United States
Buildings and structures demolished in 2018